is a former Japanese football player.

Playing career
Kitade was born in Sapporo on September 18, 1976. After graduating from Dohto University, he joined the J1 League club Júbilo Iwata in 2001. However he did not play much, as the team had many national team players, such as Hideto Suzuki, Makoto Tanaka, and Go Oiwa. In 2003, he moved to the J2 League club Shonan Bellmare. He played as a right back in a three-back defense. However he could not play at all in 2005. In 2006, he moved to the Japan Football League club Tochigi SC. He did not play much in 2006, and played more often in 2007. He retired at the end of the 2007 season.

Club statistics

References

External links

1978 births
Living people
Seisa Dohto University alumni
Association football people from Hokkaido
Japanese footballers
J1 League players
J2 League players
Japan Football League players
Júbilo Iwata players
Shonan Bellmare players
Tochigi SC players
Association football defenders
Sportspeople from Sapporo